Face to Face 2003 was a concert tour by Elton John and Billy Joel. The pair performed under the Face to Face concert series, which was constantly proving more popular amongst fans.

The tour started on 21 February in Birmingham, Alabama and travelled throughout the United States for twenty four concert dates until 8 May in Rosemont, Illinois, where the tour came to a close after this concert had been rescheduled from March.

Joel stated in 2012 that he would no longer tour with Elton because it restrains his setlists.

Set list
This set list is representative of the first performance in Las Vegas. It does not represent all concerts for the duration of the tour.

Elton and Billy with the band
"Your Song" 
"Just the Way You Are" 
"Don't Let the Sun Go Down on Me"
Elton John with his band
"Funeral for a Friend/Love Lies Bleeding"
"Someone Saved My Life Tonight" 
"Philadelphia Freedom" 
"The Wasteland" 
"I Want Love"
"Rocket Man"
"Take Me to the Pilot" 
"I Guess That's Why They Call It the Blues" 
"Tiny Dancer" 
"Crocodile Rock" 
Billy Joel with his band
"Scenes from an Italian Restaurant" 
"Movin' Out" 
"Prelude/Angry Young Man" 
"Allentown" 
"An Innocent Man" 
"The River of Dreams" 
"I Go to Extremes" 
"New York State of Mind" 
"It's Still Rock and Roll to Me" 
"Only the Good Die Young"
Billy and Elton with the band
"My Life" 
"The Bitch Is Back" 
"You May Be Right" 
"Bennie and the Jets" 
"A Hard Day's Night" 
"Great Balls of Fire" 
"Piano Man"

Tour dates

Notes

References

External links
 Information Site with Tour Dates

2003 concert tours
Billy Joel concert tours
Co-headlining concert tours
Elton John concert tours